Friska Viljor FC is a Swedish football club located in Örnsköldsvik in Örnsköldsvik Municipality, Västernorrland County.

Background
The club was formed in February 1994 but was previously the football section of the multi-sport club IF Friska Viljor.  From 1995 to 1998 the new club progressed through the league system from Division 6 to Division 2.  In 2003 the club won Division 2 Norrland and then participated in the promotion play-offs.  They won 4–3 away to Väsby IK FK and then lost 2–3 at home but were promoted to the Superettan on away goals.  Second tier football in the Superettan in 2004 proved a disappointment as Friska Viljor finished in last place and were relegated.

In subsequent years Friska Viljor FC has participated in the middle divisions of the Swedish football league system.  The club currently plays in Division 2 Norrland which is the fourth tier of Swedish football. They play their home matches at the Skyttis IP in Örnsköldsvik.  Since 2004 the club has used an artificial turf surface.

Friska Viljor reached the Semi final of the 1948 Svenska cupen. 

Friska Viljor FC are affiliated to the Ångermanlands Fotbollförbund.

Season to season

Attendances

In recent seasons Friska Viljor FC have had the following average attendances:

In their opening home game in the Superettan in 2004 Friska Viljor FC had an attendance of 1,221 against Östers IF.  Other well attended home games were the 1,012 spectators for the match with IFK Norrköping and 1,186 spectators for the match with IF Brommapojkarna.

The attendance record for Friska Viljor FC was 2,107 spectators for the match against IFK Göteborg on 1 May 2003.

Achievements

 Norrländska Mästerskapet:
 Winners (1): 1943 (as IF Friska Viljor)

Footnotes

External links
 Friska Viljor FC – Official Website

Sport in Örnsköldsvik
Association football clubs established in 1994
Football clubs in Västernorrland County
1994 establishments in Sweden